Fabrice Ziolkowski (born January 28, 1954) is a French-American screenwriter, director, producer, and voice director, best known for scripting the Oscar-nominated feature animation film The Secret of Kells, writing the animated television series Gawayn, and directing and producing the avant-garde documentary film L.A.X..

Background

  Fabrice Ziolkowski was born on January 28, 1954, in Charleville-Mézières, France.  His family emigrated, first to Montreal, Quebec, Canada, then to the United States.  He studied at the Brooks Institute of Photography, received a BA and MA in film and literature from the University of California at Santa Barbara, and did doctoral work at the University of California, Los Angeles (UCLA).

Career

Ziolkowski started his career as a member of the Lumina film group which included experimental filmmaker MM Serra.
He is foremost a screenwriter (and book writer), but has also directed and produced films. Since the 2000s, he has emerged as a voice director.
He is currently owner of Mozaic Productions and Vox Dub.  He was development executive of TF1 subsidiary Protecrea from 1999 to 2002.

Personal
Ziolkowski resides in France with his partner Luli Barzman (daughter of Ben Barzman and Norma Barzman).  He met Barzman at UCLA; the two have collaborated on various projects for years, from screenwriting to producing and directing documentaries.

He has a daughter, Marina Ziolkowski, now a third-generation filmmaker in the family.

Works

Ziolkowski is best known for his screenplay of the internationally acclaimed feature animation film The Secret of Kells.  The Hollywood Reporter described it as a "stirring tale" of "universal themes of the transcendent power of imagination and following one's dreams" in an "Irish-legend-and-lore-laced script "  The New York Times noted that "A gentle spirit of syncretism suffuses The Secret of Kells."  Variety called it a "Gorgeous hand-drawn 2D animation, which is so retro that it looks like a direct descendent of the medieval illuminated manuscript tradition, perfectly complements its tale... A tour-de-force."

His documentary L.A.X. continues to receive notice:  film scholar David James has called it "a disabused, skeptical rendering of the city’s grittier underside" which reveals "the noir realities behind the sunshine."  It has been described as "an essay" on Los Angeles, an "experimental documentary, and "a fictional structure... a journey through the city."

Filmography

Ziolkowski has directed, written, produced, and/or voice-directed feature films, television films and series in live-action and animation.

Director and producer

 Yeah! Yeah! Yeah! (2012) documentary
 Mazopo (2004) music video
 Death Letters (2000) documentary
 L.A.X. (1980) documentary

Producer

 The 1001 Lives of Lia Rodrigues (2006) documentary
 Back to Kinshasa (2003) documentary

Screenwriter

Ziolkowski has written, co-written, or edited scores of films, television series and episodes, particularly animation.
 Sadie Sparks (2019) television series
 Alvin and the Chipmunks (2015) television series
 Yeah! Yeah! Yeah! (2012) documentary
 The Bellflower Bunnies (2010) television series
 Gawayn (2009-2012) animated television series 
 The Secret of Kells (2009) feature film
 Hairy Scary (2008) television series
 Atout 5 (2007) television series
 Khochkhach (Flower of Oblivion) (2006) feature movie
 Viva Carthago (2005) television series
 Les énigmes de providence (The Mysteries of Providence) (2002) television series
 The Southern Star (2001) animation movie
 Mysterious Island (2001) animation movie
 The Greatest Show on Ice (2001) animation movie
 Death Letters (2000) documentary film
 Baby Monitor (1997) television movie
 L'amerloque (1996) television movie
 Billy the Cat (1996) television series
 Indaba(1996) television series
 Highlander (1993) television series
 Counterstrike (1992) television series
 Tattle Tale (1992) television movie
 The Venture (1992) feature film
 Hot Chocolate (1992) television movie
 Fly by Night (1991) television series
 The New Adventures of the Black Stallion (1990) television series
 Circles in a Forest (1991) feature film (with Luli Barzman)
 L.A.X. (1980) documentary film

Voice

Ziolkowski has served as voice director, actor or dialogue coach on the following:

 My Knight and Me (2017)voice recordist
 Scary Larry (2012) voice direction
 Sherlock Yack: Zoo-Detective (2011) television series - voice direction
 Lulu Vroumette (2010) television series - voice direction
 Tales of Tatonka (2010) television series - voice and voice direction
 Miss Missouri (1990) feature film - dialogue coach
 Nocturne indien (1989) feature film - dialogue coach
 Man on Fire (1987) dialogue coach and uncredited translation

Books and articles

Ziolkowski has written non-fiction and fiction books and articles, which include:

 Ashes 2 Ashes (2010) novel
 Introduction au scenario (Introduction To The Screenplay) (1999, reprinted 2006)
 "Comedies and Proverbs:  An Interview with Eric Rohmer" (1981)

References

External sources
 

1954 births
Living people
People from Charleville-Mézières
American documentary filmmakers
American film directors
English-language film directors
French-language film directors
French documentary filmmakers
French film directors
French male voice actors
French voice directors
American male voice actors
American voice directors
American television writers
American male screenwriters
French television writers
American male television writers
Ziolkowski, Fabrice
University of California, Los Angeles alumni
French documentary film producers
French expatriates in the United States